The 2012 Intercontinental Rally Challenge was the seventh and final season of the Intercontinental Rally Challenge. The season again consisted of thirteen rounds and started on 23 February with the Rallye Açores. The season ended on 3 November, at the Cyprus Rally.

Calendar
The calendar consisted of thirteen events run in Europe. The schedule included five new events, which were held in Sicily, Bulgaria, Ireland, Romania and San Marino.

Selected entries

Results

Notes

Standings

Drivers
 Only the best eight scores from each driver count towards the championship.

Manufacturers
 Only the best eight scores from each manufacturer count towards the championship.

References

External links
 The official website of the Intercontinental Rally Challenge

Intercontinental Rally Challenge seasons
Intercontinental Rally Challenge